Kodiak is a brand of dipping tobacco manufactured by American Snuff Company, a U.S. smokeless tobacco manufacturer that also produces the Grizzly tobacco and Levi Garrett brands. Introduced in 1980, Kodiak is currently available in three flavors: Wintergreen, Mint (formerly Ice), and Straight, each featuring a picture of a Kodiak bear on the top label. Kodiak recently introduced pouches, which hold the moist snuff in a tea-bag like pouch, preventing it from spreading around the mouth and keeping it out of the teeth.

The Kodiak Wintergreen variety is a strong brand of dipping tobacco.  It is a basic mixture with high nicotine content and a pH as high as 8.35. It has high levels of deprotonated nicotine, "the chemical form... that is most readily absorbed through the mouth into the bloodstream," when compared amongst other brands.

Sponsorships

Kodiak sponsored many NASCAR teams from the late 1980s to 2001. Levi Garett sponsored some races too. Notable drivers who drove for Kodiak/Levi Garett are Rusty Wallace, Ken Schrader, Ricky Craven, Steve Grissom, and Stacy Compton. Kodiak was the 1989 NASCAR Winston Cup Championship winning sponsor with Rusty Wallace in the No.27 Blue Max Racing Pontiac. The snuff company also sponsored Hendrick Motorsports, Larry Hedrick Motorsports, and Melling Racing.

In 2019, Kyle Larson threw back to Craven's 1996 Kodiak livery with Larry Hedrick Racing in the Southern 500 with a Clover Network sponsorship instead of Kodiak, whose colors are similar.

Flavors

 Longcut Straight
 Longcut Mint
 Longcut Wintergreen
 Longcut Natural
 Extra Longcut Natural
 Snuff
 Wintergreen Pouches

See also
Snus

References

Chewing tobacco brands
IARC Group 1 carcinogens